The 1971 Virginia Slims Masters was a women's singles tennis tournament played on outdoor clay court at the Bartlett Park Tennis Center in St. Petersburg, Florida in the United States. The event was part of the 1971 WT Woman's Pro Tour. It was the inaugural edition of the tournament and was held from April 5 through April 11, 1971. Chris Evert won the singles title but was not entitled to the $2,000 first-prize money due to her amateur status.

Finals

Singles
 Chris Evert defeated  Julie Heldman 6–1, 6–2
 It was Evert's second singles title of the year and of her career.

Doubles
 Françoise Dürr /  Ann Haydon-Jones defeated  Judy Tegart Dalton /  Julie Heldman 7–6, 3–6, 6–3

Prize money

References

Virginia Slims Masters
Eckerd Open
Virginia Slims Masters
Virginia Slims Masters
Virginia Slims Masters